Janarbek Kubanychovich Akayev (born 13 December 1986) is a Kyrgyz politician, and current member of the Supreme Council of Kyrgyzstan.

Early life and education
Akayev was born on 13 December 1986 in the village of Kabylan-Kul in Osh Oblast in the Kirgiz SSR, now Kyrgyzstan. In 2009 he graduated from Osh State University with a degree in journalism.

Career

Radio Azattyk and press secretary, 2008–2015
Akayev joined the Kyrgyz chapter of Radio Free Europe/Radio Liberty, Radio Azattyk in February 2008, and between 2012 and 2013 was a correspondent for RFE/RL in Prague. For six months between February and August 2015, he was Almazbek Atambayev's press secretary.

Jogorku Kenesh deputy, 2015–present
Akayev was elected as deputy for the Social Democratic Party of Kyrgyzstan in the 2015 parliamentary election, until he was expelled from the party in March 2017.

Personal life
Akayev is married, and is the father to one child.

See also
List of members of the Supreme Council (Kyrgyzstan), 2015–present

References

Living people
1986 births
People from Osh Region
Members of the Supreme Council (Kyrgyzstan)
Osh State University alumni